
This is a list of the 29 players who earned their 2012 PGA Tour card through Q School in 2011. Note: Roberto Castro and Mark Anderson had already qualified for the PGA Tour by placing in the Top 25 during the 2011 Nationwide Tour season; they did not count among the Top 25 Q school graduates.

Players in yellow were 2012 PGA Tour rookies.

2012 Results

*PGA Tour rookie in 2012
T = Tied 
Green background indicates the player retained his PGA Tour card for 2013 (won or finished inside the top 125). 
Yellow background indicates the player did not retain his PGA Tour card for 2013, but retained conditional status (finished between 126-150). 
Red background indicates the player did not retain his PGA Tour card for 2013 (finished outside the top 150).

Winners on the PGA Tour in 2012

Runners-up on the PGA Tour in 2012

See also
2011 Nationwide Tour graduates

References
Results from pgatour.com

PGA Tour Qualifying School
PGA Tour Qualifying School Graduates
PGA Tour Qualifying School Graduates